Umzumbe Local Municipality is an administrative area in the Ugu District of KwaZulu-Natal in South Africa.

The municipality is named after the Umzumbe River.

Towns within the municipal boundaries: Friedenau, KwaDweshula, St Faith’s, Umzumbe.

Income levels in Umzumbe are very low, and reflect a situation of acute impoverishment. Almost 60% of all households have an income of less than R500 per month. Households rely for survival on pension and other welfare grants, migrant remittances, informal earnings and casual employment wages.

Main places
The 2001 census divided the municipality into the following main places:

Politics 

The municipal council consists of thirty-nine members elected by mixed-member proportional representation. Twenty councillors are elected by first-past-the-post voting in twenty wards, while the remaining nineteen are chosen from party lists so that the total number of party representatives is proportional to the number of votes received. In the election of 3 August 2016 the African National Congress (ANC) won a majority of thirty seats on the council.
The following table shows the results of the election.

References

External links
 http://www.umzumbe.gov.za/
 http://umzumbe.local.gov.za/

Local municipalities of the Ugu District Municipality
KwaZulu-Natal South Coast